The Department of Information & Cultural Affairs of West Bengal, previously known as the Department of Information & Public Relations, is a Bengal government ministry. It is a nodal ministry mainly responsible for the information, culture, film and archaeological heritage related activities of the State. The principal objectives of the department are to disseminate information about the activities & achievements of the state government through different media, to keep the ministers & other senior government functionaries aware of the public reaction reflected through the media & other sources, to promote & preserve Bengali cultural heritage (including the folk culture), to preserve West Bengal's archaeological heritage, to coordinate with important personalities and facilitate all activities related to films, theatre, art, etc., to organize state ceremonies, and to extend hospitality to visiting Indian and foreign dignitaries.

Ministerial team 
The ministerial team is headed by the Cabinet Minister for Information & Cultural Affairs, who may or may not be supported by Ministers of State. Civil servants are assigned to them to manage the ministers' office and ministry.

The current head of the ministry is Mamata Banerjee who is also the Chief Minister of West Bengal.

References 

Government of West Bengal
Government departments of West Bengal
West Bengal